This is a list of people who have served as Lord Lieutenant of Lancashire. The Lord Lieutenant is the King's personal representative in each county of the United Kingdom. Historically the Lord Lieutenant was responsible for organising the county's militia, but it is today a largely ceremonial position, usually awarded to a retired notable, military officer, nobleman, or businessman in the county.

Lords Lieutenant

Deputy lieutenants
A deputy lieutenant of Lancashire is commissioned by the Lord Lieutenant of Lancashire. Deputy lieutenants support the work of the lord-lieutenant. There can be several deputy lieutenants at any time, depending on the population of the county. Their appointment does not terminate with the changing of the lord-lieutenant, but they usually retire at age 75.

18th Century
19 November 1791: Thomas Townley Parker, Esq.
19 November 1791: William Farrington, Esq.

19th Century
19 November 1847: James Heywood

Sources 
 

 The Lord-Lieutenant of Lancashire, Lancashire County Council

References

Lancashire
 
Lancashire-related lists